Fort Saginaw Mall was an enclosed shopping mall located in Buena Vista Township, just outside the city of Saginaw, Michigan, United States. Opened in 1966, the mall served as Saginaw's only enclosed mall until Fashion Square Mall opened on the other end of town in 1972. Fort Saginaw Mall had become a dead mall by the 1980s, as many of its stores had closed. By the end of the 1990s, the entire mall was closed off, except for an attached Kmart which remained open until May 2004.

The vacant mall was owned by Cafaro Company of Youngstown, Ohio long after its closure. Although the community had made plans to demolish it, Cafaro initially refused to sell to the charter township. However, in April 2008, the township has claimed title to the abandoned building, and announced plans to redevelop it.

History
Fort Saginaw Mall opened in Buena Vista Township, a charter township just outside the city limits of Saginaw, Michigan, in 1966. It was an "L"-shaped enclosed mall, comprising an eastern and southern wing. Federal's, a department store based in Detroit, Michigan, served as the eastern anchor store; at the southern end, but not accessible from the mall concourse itself, was a Kmart discount store with adjacent Kmart Foods supermarket. A five-and-dime store called Scott's 5 & 10, as well as a small movie theater, were also located in the southern wing, and overall, the mall comprised forty stores at its peak. It was the only mall in Saginaw until Fashion Square Mall opened in 1972, on the north end of town.

In 1976, the theater closed amid rumors that its manager had been murdered. Also in the 1970s, Scott's 5 & 10 was converted to T G & Y. Federal closed its stores in the late 1970s, and their store at Fort Saginaw Mall was eventually replaced with Burlington Coat Factory. The elimination of the Kmart Foods line made way for an expansion of the mall's Kmart store into the space formerly occupied by Kmart Foods. At some point in the 1980s, Big Lots was also added in the eastern wing. This store, however, was only accessible from outside. In addition, T G & Y was closed in the 1980s and replaced with Norman's, a local sporting goods store.

After Burlington Coat Factory relocated in 1991, its former space at the mall was assumed by Phar-Mor, a discount drugstore chain, which closed all of its Michigan locations a year later. The mall's remaining tenants began to close off in the 1990s as well, and by the end of the decade, the entire mall (except for Kmart) was shuttered. Kmart finally closed in May 2004.

An outparcel building was originally occupied by Ray's Food Fair, then Giant Supermarket, and ultimately Kessel Food Market.

Demolition of 2009
In 2007, Buena Vista Charter Township officials made plans to buy the property from Cafaro Company for $2 million; Cafaro, however, refused to sell the mall, as they had plans to redevelop it. In April 2008, Buena Vista Charter Township successfully purchased the property, and may later redevelop it for various uses. The township has also kept a Burger King restaurant in the mall's parking lot, as well as a strip mall behind the mall (which includes a Save-A-Lot grocery store), thus making both properties tenants of the township. In November 2009, crews began the demolition process for the mall, which had been boarded up and heavily vandalized since its closure.

References

Buildings and structures in Saginaw County, Michigan
Shopping malls in Michigan
Defunct shopping malls in the United States
Demolished shopping malls in the United States
Shopping malls established in 1966